Rostok is an unincorporated community in the town of Pierce, Kewaunee County, Wisconsin, United States.

The community was named after a city in Bohemia.

References

Unincorporated communities in Kewaunee County, Wisconsin
Unincorporated communities in Wisconsin